Faustino Rodríguez-San Pedro y Díaz-Argüelles (1833, in Gijón – 1925) was Mayor of Madrid in 1890, and a deputy in the Spanish National Congress, and then a political minister in the governments of Francisco Silvela and Antonio Maura. He was a lawyer who joined the Conservative party at that time. He is great grandfather of former Spanish politician and former IMF chief Rodrigo Rato.

|-

1833 births
1925 deaths
People from Gijón
Conservative Party (Spain) politicians
Economy and finance ministers of Spain
Foreign ministers of Spain
Government ministers of Spain
Members of the Congress of Deputies of the Spanish Restoration
Members of the Senate of Spain
Politicians from Asturias
Mayors of Madrid